Philip Lutgendorf is an American Indologist. He is Professor of Hindu and Modern Indian Studies at the University of Iowa. His areas of work and interest include the epic poem Ramcharitmanas, the life and works of Hindu poet Tulsidas, the worship of Hanuman, Indian popular cinema, and the Indian tea culture. He is currently translating the Ramcharitmanas into English: this translation will be published by the Murty Classical Library of India in seven volumes. He serves as the President of American Institute of Indian Studies.

Education and career
Lutgendorf received a B.A. degree from the University of Chicago. In 1987, he received a PhD degree with distinction from the Department of South Asian Languages and Civilizations of the University of Chicago. His dissertation was titled "The Life of a Text: Tulsidas' Ramcaritmanas in Performance."

Since 1985, Lutgendorf has taught at the Department of Asian and Slavic Languages and Literature of the University of Iowa. He has developed and taught courses on several subjects including Hindi language and written and oral narrative traditions of South Asia including the Ramcharitmanas, Hindu mythology, Indian literature, Indian theatre, and Indian cinema.

Honors and recognition
Lutgendorf received the A. K. Coomaraswamy Prize for the book The Life of a Text. In March 2002, he received the Guggenheim Fellowship for research on the Hindu god Hanuman. In 2014, he received the Fulbright-Hays fellowship for research on the cultural history of chai (tea) in India.

Historians Barbara Metcalf and Thomas Metcalf called the website on Hindi films maintained by Lutgendorf "an excellent website on Hindi films." Freek Bakker wrote that Lutgendorf is an "expert in the Indian Ramayana tradition" and has done "profound research into the Ramayana katha tradition."

Dr. Lutgendorf received the Tulsi Award by Pujya Morari Bapu on June 25, 2017, in Estes Park, CO.  The Tulsi Award is typically presented on the day of Tulsi Jayanti (the birth date of Goswāmi Tulsidās) and recognises the lineage of those who recite kathas – their efforts to preserve the teachings of the scriptures and maintain the traditions of India. Although Dr. Lutgendorf was invited to Mahuva, India in the coming weeks, due to scheduling conflicts, Pujya Morari Bapu awarded the Tulsi Award in June 2017.

Selected bibliography
The Life of a Text: Performing the Ramcaritmanas of Tulsidas, University of California Press. 1991. .
Ramcaritmanas Word Index/Manas shabda anukramanika (with Winand M. Callewaert), New Delhi: Manohar Publisher & Distributors, New Delhi. 1997. .
From the Ramcaritmanas of Tulsidas, Book Five: Sundar Kand, Indian Literature, vol. XLV, no. 3: 143–181.
Hanuman's Tale: The Messages of a Divine Monkey, New York: Oxford University Press. 2006. .
The Indo-Aryan languages, RoutledgeCurzon, 2002 
Tulsidas: The Epic of Ram (7 volumes), Murty Classical Library of India: Harvard University Press. Forthcoming.

References

External links
Philip Lutgendorf's webpage on the website of University of Iowa
philip's fil-ums: notes on Indian popular cinema by Philip Lutgendorf

Linguists from the United States
American Indologists
Living people
Year of birth missing (living people)
University of Iowa faculty